The following is a list of Executive Government of Colombia entities:

Social Security Sector 
 Ministry of Social Protection
 Caja de Previsión Social de Comunicaciones (Social Provident Communication Fund Register)
 Caja Nacional de Previsión Social E.I.C.E (National Register of the E.I.C.E Provident Communication Fund)
 Centro Dermatológico Federico Lleras Acosta
 Comisión de Regulación en Salud
 Empresa Social del Estado Antonio Nariño
 Empresa Social del Estado Francisco de Paula Santander
 Empresa Social del Estado José Prudencio Padilla
 Empresa Social del Estado Luis Carlos Galán Sarmiento
 Empresa Social del Estado Policarpa Salavarrieta
 Empresa Social del Estado Rafael Uribe Uribe
 Empresa Social del Estado Rita Arango Álvarez del Pino
 Empresa Territorial para la Salud
 Fondo de Bienestar Social de la Contraloría General de la República
 Fondo de Pasivo Social de Ferrocarriles Nacionales de Colombia
 Fondo de Previsión Social del Congreso
 Fondo Nacional de Estupefacientes
 Instituto Colombiano de Bienestar Familiar
 Instituto de Seguros Sociales
 Instituto Nacional de Cancerología E.S.E
 Instituto Nacional de Salud
 Instituto Nacional de Vigilancia de Medicamentos y Alimentos
 Sanatorio Agua de Dios E.S.E
 Sanatorio de Contratación E.S.E
 Servicio Nacional de Aprendizaje
 Sociedad CAJANAL S.A. E.P.S
 Superintendencia de Subsidio Familiar
 Superintendencia Nacional de Salud

Agriculture and rural development sector 
 Ministry of Agriculture and Rural Development
 Almacenes Generales de Depósito de la Caja Agraria y el Banco Ganadero S.A
 Banco Agrario de Colombia S.A
 Caja de Compensación Familiar Campesina
 Centro Internacional de Agricultura Orgánica
 Corporación Colombiana de Investigación Agropecuaria
 Corporación Financiera Ganadera
 Corporación Nacional de Investigaciones Forestales
 Empresa Colombiana de Productos Veterinarios S.A
 Fiduagraria S.A
 Fondo Ganadero de Sucre S.A
 Fondo para el Financiamiento del Sector Agropecuario
 Instituto Colombiano Agropecuario
 Instituto Colombiano de Desarrollo Rural

Environment, Housing and Territory Development 
 Ministry of Environment, Housing and Territorial Development (Minambiente) 
 Potable Water and Basic Sanitation Regulation Commission (CRA)
 Sinchi Amazonic Institute of Scientific Research
 Institute of Hydrology, Meteorology and Environmental Studies (IDEAM)
 John von Neumann Environmental Research Institute of the Pacific (IIAP)
 Alexander von Humboldt Biological Resources Research Institute
 José Benito Vives de Andréis Marine and Coastal Research Institute (INVEMAR)
 Special Administrative Unit of the National Natural Parks System
 National Savings Fund
 National Housing Fund (FONVIVIENDA)
 Regional Autonomous Corporation of the Negro and Nare Watersheds
 Regional Autonomous Corporation of Boyacá
 Regional Autonomous Corporation of Caldas
 Regional Autonomous Corporation of Chivor
 Regional Autonomous Corporation for the Defence of the Bucaramanga Plateau
 Regional Autonomous Corporation of Northeast Frontier
 Regional Autonomous Corporation of La Guajira
 Regional Autonomous Corporation of the Orinoquía
 Regional Autonomous Corporation of the Sinú and San Jorge Valleys
 Regional Autonomous Corporation of Nariño
 Regional Autonomous Corporation of Risaralda
 Regional Autonomous Corporation of Santander
 Regional Autonomous Corporation of Sucre
 Regional Autonomous Corporation of Cesar
 Regional Autonomous Corporation of Upper Magdalena
 Regional Autonomous Corporation of Atlántico
 Regional Autonomous Corporation of the Dique Canal
 Regional Autonomous Corporation of Central Antioquia
 Regional Autonomous Corporation of Guavio
 Regional Autonomous Corporation of Magdalena
 Regional Autonomous Corporation of Quindío
 Regional Autonomous Corporation of South Bolívar
 Regional Autonomous Corporation of Tolima
 Corporation for the Sustainable Development of the Macarena
 Corporation for the Sustainable Development of the Mojana and San Jorge
 Corporation for the Sustainable Development of the Archipelago of San Andrés, Providencia and Santa Calatina
 Corporation for the Sustainable Development of Chocó
 Corporation for the Sustainable Development of North-East Amazon
 Corporation for the Sustainable Development of South Amazon
 Corporation for the Sustainable Development of Uraba

Commerce and Tourism sector 
 Ministry of Commerce, Industry and Tourism (Mincomercio)
 Proexport
 National Guarantees Fund, S.A. (FNG)
 Artesanías de Colombia, S.A.
 Bancóldex
 Fiducoldex
 Superintendency of Industry and Commerce (SIC)
 Superintendency of Corporations (Supersociedades)

Communications sector 
 Ministry of Information Technologies and Communications
 Administración Postal Nacional (in liquidation)
 Colombia Telecomunicaciones S.A. E.S.P
 Comisión de Regulación de Telecomunicaciones
 Computadores para Educar
 Empresa de Telecomunicaciones de Bucaramanga
 Empresa de Telecomunicaciones de Santa Marta
 Empresa de Telecomunicaciones de Tequendama
 Fondo de Comunicaciones
 Programa Compartel
 Radio Televisión Nacional de Colombia

Culture sector 
 Ministry of Culture
 General Archive of the Nation
 National Library of Colombia
 Caro and Cuervo Institute
 Colombian Institute of Anthropology and History (ICANH)
 Colombian Institute of Sport, (Coldeportes)
 National Museum of Colombia

National Defense Sector 
 Ministry of National Defense
 Agencia Logística de las Fuerzas Militares
 Colombian National Armada
 Caja de Retiro de las Fuerzas Militares
 Caja de Sueldos de Retiro de la Policía Nacional
 Caja Promotora de Vivienda Militar y de Policía
 Club Militar
 Colombian Armed Forces General Command
 Comisión Colombiana del Océano
 Comisionado Nacional para la Policía
 Corporación de la Industria Aeronáutica Colombiana S.A
 Colombian Civil Defense
 Direccion General de Sanidad Militar
 Dirección General Marítima
 Colombian National Army
 Fondo Nacional para la Defensa y la Libertad Personal
 Fondo Rotatorio de la Policía Nacional
 Colombian Air Force
 Hospital Militar Central
 Industria Militar
 Instituto de Casas Fiscales del Ejército
 Colombian National Police
 Servicio Aéreo a Territorios Nacionales
 Sociedad Hotel San Diego S.A., Hotel Tequendama
 Superintendencia de Vigilancia y Seguridad Privada

Solidarity Economy sector 
 National Administrative Department of Solidary Economy

National Education sector 
 Ministry of National Education
 Colegio Mayor de Bolívar
 Escuela Nacional del Deporte
 Fondo de Desarrollo para la Educación Superior
 Instituto Colombiano de Crédito Educativo y Estudios Técnicos en el Exterior Mariano Ospina Pérez, ICETEX
 Instituto Colombiano para el Fomento de la Educación Superior
 Instituto de Educación Técnica Profesional de Roldanillo
 Instituto Nacional de Formación Técnica Profesional de San Andrés, Providencia y Santa Catalina
 Instituto Nacional de Formación Técnica Profesional de San Juan del Cesar
 Instituto Nacional para Ciegos
 Instituto Nacional para Sordos
 Instituto Técnico Central
 Instituto Tecnológico de SoledadAtlantico
 Instituto Tecnológico del Putumayo
 Instituto Tecnológico Pascual Bravo
 Instituto Tolimense de Formación Técnica Profesional
 Junta Central de Contadores
 National University of Colombia
 Francisco de Paula Santander University
 University of Caldas
 University of Cordoba
 University of the Amazon
 University of the Llanos
 University of Pamplona
 University of the Pacific
 Universidad Nacional Abierta y a Distancia UNAD
 National Pedagogic University
 Universidad Pedagógica y Tecnológica de Colombia
 Popular University of Cesar
 South Colombian University
 Technological University of Pereira
 Technological University of Choco

Statistics sector 
 National Administrative Department of Statistics, DANE
 Fondo Rotatorio del Departamento Administrativo Nacional de Estadística
 Geographic Institute Agustín Codazzi

Public Function sector 
 Administrative Department of Public Service
 Escuela Superior de Administración Pública

Finance and Public Credit sector 
 Ministry of Finance and Public Credit
 Banco del Estado
 Central de Inversiones S.A.
 Contaduría General de la Nación
 National Directorate of Taxes and Customs
 Fiduciaria la Previsora S.A.
 Financiera de Desarrollo Territorial S.A.
 Fondo de Garantías de Entidades Cooperativas
 Fondo de Garantías de Instituciones Financieras
 Granbanco S.A.
 La Previsora S.A. Compañía de Seguros
 Superintendencia de Economía Solidaria
 Superintendencia Financiera de Colombia
 Unidad de Información y Análisis Financiero

Interior and Justice sector 
 Ministry of the Interior and Justice
 Nasa Kiwe Corporation
 Dirección Nacional de Estupefacientes
 Fondo para la Participación y el Fortalecimiento de la Democracia
 National Printing Office of Colombia
 National Penitentiary and Prison Institute
 Superintendency of Notaries and Registration
 Unidad Administrativa Especial Dirección Nacional de Derecho de 
 Superintendencia Financiera de Colombia

Mining and Energy sector 
 Ministry of Mines and Energy
 Agencia Nacional de Hidrocarburos
 Archipiegago's Power S.Light. Co. S.A. E.S.P
 Central Hidroeléctrica de Caldas S.A E.S.P
 Centrales Eléctricas de Nariño S.A E.S.P
 Centrales Eléctricas de Norte de Santander S.A E.S.P
 Centrales Eléctricas del Cauca S.A E.S.P
 Colombian Geological Survey
 Comisión de Regulación de Energía y Gas
 Corporación Eléctrica de la Costa Atlántica S.A ESP
 Ecopetrol S.A.
 Electrificadora de Boyacá S.A E.S.P
 Electrificadora de Santander S.A E.S.P
 Electrificadora del Amazonas S.A E.S.P
 Electrificadora del Caquetá S.A. E.S.P
 Electrificadora del Chocó S.A E.S.P
 Electrificadora del Huila S.A E.S.P
 Electrificadora del Meta S.A E.S.P
 Electrificadora del Tolima S.A E.S.P
 Empresa Colombiana de Gas
 Empresa de Energía de Arauca S.A E.S.P
 Empresa de Energía del Quindío S.A. E.S.P
 Empresa URRA S.A E.S.P
 Financiera Energética Nacional S.A
 Instituto Colombiano de Geología y Minería, Ingeominas
 Instituto de Planificación y Promoción de Soluciones Energéticas
 Interconexión Eléctrica I.S.A E.S.P.
 ISAGEN S.A. E.S.P
 Sociedad Promotora de Energía de Colombia S.A.
 Unidad de Planeación Minero Energética

Planning sector 
 National Planning Department (DNP)
 National Fund for Development Projects (FONADE)
 Administrative Department of Science, Technology and Innovation (Colciencias)
 Superintendency of Residential Public Services (SSP)

Presidency of the Republic sector 
 Administrative Department of the Presidency of the Republic
 Agencia Presidencial para la Acción Social y la Cooperación Internacional
 Office of the Vice President of Colombia

Foreign Affairs sector 
 Ministry of Foreign Affairs
 Fondo Rotatorio del Ministerio de Relaciones Exteriores

Security sector 
 National Intelligence Directorate

Transport Sector 
 Ministry of Transport (Mintransporte) 
 National Institute of Concessions (INCO)
 National Roads Institute (INVÍAS)
 Superintendency of Ports and Transport (Supertransporte)
 Special Administrative Unit of Civil Aeronautics (Aerocivil)

See also 
List of Colombian Department Governors

Executive branch